The H-110 Sarir (Persian: سریر, meaning "Throne") was an Iranian UAV which was unveiled in a ceremony in April 2013 by IRIA. The UAV is optimized for intelligence, surveillance and reconnaissance roles using electro-optic and infra-red sensors. Iranian state media reports suggest it may be capable of carrying air-to-air weapons; however, independent verification of this has yet to emerge. The aircraft is fitted with twin inboard wing pylons to support stores carriage.

Range and endurance data for the type remains unclear. Iranian state media have claimed the UAV has stealth characteristics however its use of twin propellers, in a tractor-pusher configuration, would have the direct result of creating a very large radar cross section, as would its external stores pylons. Likewise the airframe fails to exhibit recognized low observable shaping such as cantered tail surfaces and blended wing body structures.

Status 
10 are believed to be in service.

See also
Karrar
Shahed 129
Unmanned combat air vehicle
List of military equipment manufactured in Iran

References

 

 

Unmanned military aircraft of Iran
Iranian military aircraft
Aircraft manufactured in Iran
Islamic Republic of Iran Air Force
Post–Cold War military equipment of Iran
Unmanned aerial vehicles of Iran